Vavuniya District ( Vavuṉiyā Māvaṭṭam) is one of the 25 districts of Sri Lanka, the second level administrative division of the country. The district is administered by a District Secretariat headed by a District Secretary (previously known as a Government Agent) appointed by the central government of Sri Lanka. The capital of the district is the city of Vavuniya.

History
Between 5th century BC and 13th century AD present day Vavuniya District was part of Rajarata. Vavuniya District was thereafter ruled by Vanniar Chieftains who paid tribute to the pre-colonial Jaffna kingdom. The district then came under Portuguese, Dutch and British control. In 1815 the British gained control of the entire island of Ceylon. They divided the island into three ethnic based administrative structures: Low Country Sinhalese, Kandyan Sinhalese and Tamil. The district, which was then called Vanni District, was part of the Tamil administration. In 1833, in accordance with the recommendations of the Colebrooke-Cameron Commission, the ethnic based administrative structures were unified into a single administration divided into five geographic provinces. Vanni District, together with Jaffna District and Mannar District, formed the new Northern Province.

Vanni District was later renamed Mullaitivu District and then Vavuniya District. At the time that Ceylon gained independence, Vavuniya was one of the three districts located in the Northern Province. Mullaitivu District was carved out of the northern part of Vavuniya District in September 1978.

Parts of Vavuniya District were under the control of rebel Liberation Tigers of Tamil Eelam for many years during the civil war. The entire district was recaptured by the Sri Lankan military in 2008.

Geography
Vavuniya District is located in the north of Sri Lanka in the Northern Province.

Administrative units
Vavuniya District is divided into 4 Divisional Secretary's Division (DS Divisions), each headed by a Divisional Secretary (previously known as an Assistant Government Agent). The DS Divisions are further sub-divided into 102 Grama Niladhari Divisions (GN Divisions).

Demographics

Population
Vavuniya District's population was 171,511 in 2012. The population of the district is mostly Sri Lankan Tamil.

The population of the district, like the rest of the north and east of Sri Lanka, has been heavily affected by the civil war. The war killed an estimated 100,000 people. Several hundred thousand Sri Lankan Tamils, possibly as much as one million, emigrated to the West during the war. Many Sri Lankan Tamils also moved to the relative safety of the capital Colombo. Most of the Sri Lankan Moors and Sinhalese who lived in the district fled to other parts of Sri Lanka or were forcibly expelled by the rebel Liberation Tigers of Tamil Eelam, though most of them have returned to the district since the end of the civil war.

Ethnicity

Religion

Politics and government

Local government

Vavuniya District has 5 local authorities of which one is an Urban Council and the remaining 4 are Divisional Councils (Pradesha Sabhai or Pradeshiya Sabha).

Notes

References

External links

 Vavuniya District Secretariat

 
Districts of Sri Lanka